The 2014 Northern NSW Football season was the first season under the new competition format in northern New South Wales.  The competition consisted of six divisions across the district. The overall premier for the new structure qualified for the National Premier Leagues finals series, competing with the other state federation champions in a final knockout tournament to decide the National Premier Leagues Champion for 2014.

League Tables

2014 National Premier League Northern NSW

The 2014 National Premier League Northern NSW season was played over 18 rounds, from February to August 2014. The bottom team was relegated to the 2015 Northern NSW State League Division 1.

Finals

Top Scorers

2014 Northern NSW State League Division 1

The 2014 Northern NSW State League Division 1 season was the first edition of the new Northern NSW State League Division 1 as the second level domestic association football competition in the district of Northern NSW. 8 teams competed, all playing each other three times for a total of 21 rounds, with the top team at the end of the year being promoted to the 2015 National Premier Leagues Northern NSW, subject to meeting criteria.

Finals

2014 Zone Premier League

The 2014 Zone Premier League season was the first edition of the new Zone Premier League as the third level domestic association football competition in the district of Northern NSW. 10 teams competed, all playing each other twice for a total of 18 rounds.

Finals

2014 Zone League 1

The 2014 Zone League 1 season was the first edition of the Zone League 1 as the fourth level domestic association football competition in the district of Northern NSW. 9 teams competed, all playing each other twice for a total of 16 matches.

Finals

2014 Zone League 2

The 2014 Zone League 2 season was the first edition of the Zone League 2 as the fifth level domestic association football competition in the district of Northern NSW. 10 teams competed, all playing each other twice for a total of 18 matches.

Finals

2014 Zone League 3

The 2014 Zone League 3 season was the first edition of the Zone League 3 as the sixth level domestic association football competition in the district of Northern NSW. 7 teams competed, all playing each other twice for a total of 18 matches.

Finals

2014 Women's Premier League

The highest tier domestic football competition in Northern NSW for women was known for sponsorship reasons as the Herald Women's Premier League. The 8 teams played a quadruple round-robin for a total of 20 games, followed by a finals series.

Cup Competitions

2014 NNSWF State Cup

2014 was the 5th edition of the NNSWF State Cup, which served as the preliminary rounds for the FFA Cup for the Northern NSW Federation. The Cup winner and runner-up entered the FFA Cup at the Round of 32. The Cup competition, which was open to all men’s NNSWF Premier Competition Clubs and Senior Zone Member Clubs, consisted of five rounds, quarter-finals, semi-finals and a final. Broadmeadow Magic FC clinched the 2014 Cup with a 6–5 victory over South Cardiff.

References

2014 in Australian soccer